R&C, RC, R/C, Rc, or rc may refer to:

Science and technology

Computing
 rc, the default Command line interface in Version 10 Unix and Plan 9 from Bell Labs
 .rc (for "run commands"), a filename extension for configuration files in UNIX-like environments
 rc, a file extension and compiler for Microsoft Windows resource scripts
 Reconfigurable computing
 Release Candidate, a term used in software engineering
 Return code, used to identify errors or other aspects of software behavior
 RigidChips, a rigid body simulator program
 "Rivest's Cipher," a term used in cryptographic algorithms
 RoundCube, a web-based IMAP e-mail client
RealityCapture, a photogrammetry software

Electronics
 RC circuit, resistance/capacitance circuit, a term used in electronics
 Radio control, a technology found in remote control vehicles
 Reflection coefficient of a circuit
 Remote control, a technology found in home entertainment devices

Other uses in science and technology
 SJ Rc, a Swedish locomotive
 Reinforced concrete, concrete incorporating reinforcement bars ("rebars")
 Research chemicals, chemical substances intended for research purposes and laboratory use
 Pharmacological Research Chemical, in laboratory use and "grey" markets for psychoactive drugs
 Reverse Circulation, a term used in drilling rig
 Ridge Connector
 Ritchey–Chrétien telescope 
 Lexus RC

Arts and entertainment
 RC (Toy Story), a character from the Disney Pixar film franchise
 Refused Classification, a designation by the Office of Film and Literature Classification (Australia) for a banned film
 Star Wars: Republic Commando, a first-person shooter game for Xbox and PC
 Robot Chicken, a TV show on Adult Swim
 Rubik's Cube, a toy

Businesses and organizations
 Atlantic Airways (IATA airline code RC)
 Rainforest Cafe
 Recurse Center, a programming retreat and intentional community in New York, New York, United States
 Re-evaluation Counseling, an organization for personal growth and social change
 Resistance Council of Uganda
 Restorative Circles, a community-based form of restorative justice
 Civil Revolution, a short-lived political alliance in Italy
 Union Revolutionary Council, the supreme governing body of Burma from 1962 to 1974
 Royal Caribbean
 Royal Commission
 Royal Crown Cola, a soda producer, also known as RC Cola

Schools
 Renaissance College, Hong Kong
 Residential College at Mary Foust, a living-learning residence hall at UNCG
 Ridley College, a private boarding school in St. Catharines, Ontario, Canada
 Riverside College, Inc., a medical college in the Philippines
 Roanoke College, a private college in Salem, Virginia, United States
 Robert College, a private high school in Istanbul, Turkey

People
 R. C. Buford, American basketball executive
 R. C. Orlan, baseball player
 R. C. Slocum, American football player and coach
 Richard Childress, a NASCAR team owner
 Roberto Carlos, a retired Brazilian football player

Sports
 Rogers Centre, a multi-purpose stadium, home of the Toronto Blue Jays and Toronto Argonauts
 Rosario Central, a football club in Argentina
 Royal Challengers Bangalore, an Indian Premier League team
 Runs created, a baseball statistic
 Rugby Club

Other uses
 ṛc "verse" in Sanskrit
 rc "R's chankas
 RC Roads, Puducherry, India
 Relative clause, in linguistics, a subordinate clause that modifies a noun
 Reserve Component, in the United States military
 Revenue Commissioners, in Ireland
 Roman Catholic, a religion

See also

 Arcee, a female Autobot from the Transformers
 Arsie, Belluno, Veneto, Italy
 Arsy, Oise, Hauts-de-France, France
 
 CR (disambiguation)
 R (disambiguation)
 C (disambiguation)